Richard Preston (born 1954) is an American writer.

Richard Preston may also refer to:

 Richard Preston (MP) (1768–1850), English legal author and politician
 Richard Preston (clergyman) (c. 1791–1861), American religious leader
 Richard Preston, 1st Earl of Desmond (died 1628), Scottish court favourite of King James VI
 Richard Franklin Preston (1860–1929), Canadian physician and political figure
 Richard Preston, a pen-name of Jack Lindsay (1900–1990) Australian-born British author